Friedrich Karl Waechter (3 November 1937 in Danzig – 16 September 2005 in Frankfurt) was a renowned German cartoonist, author, and playwright.

Life
Waechter was born in Danzig as a son of a teacher. His family fled over the Baltic Sea after World War II and settled in Sahms (Schleswig-Holstein).

Waechter attended the Lauenburg Scholar School in Ratzeburg, where his graphic talents became apparent. He then studied graphic art in Hamburg.  In 1962, he moved to Frankfurt and took a job drawing cartoons in an advertisement magazine Die Zeit.  His work attracted the attention of the editors of the soon-to-be satire magazine, Pardon.  They gave Waechter a preliminary copy and asked for his suggestions.  Waechter's constructive criticism earned him a job with the fledgling magazine.

While at Pardon, he co-founded the Neue Frankfurter Schule (New Frankfurt School), a group of eminent comic writers and cartoonists.  The name was a play on the Frankfurter Schule of Theodor Adorno and Max Horkheimer.  The group included Robert Gernhardt, F. W. Bernstein, Bernd Eilert, Eckhard Henscheid, Peter Knorr, Hans Traxler, and Chlodwig Poth.  Their work celebrated subversive nonsense, typified by Pardon's regular "Welt in Spiegel" ("In the Mirror") feature.

Waechter became a father and, by 1970, began writing children's books.  Many of these encouraged the reader to complete puzzles and drawings, write in the book, cut it up, or otherwise participate in the story.  The books appealed to both children and adults and showcased his artistic talents:  simple yet expressive cartoons, carefully cross-hatched pen and ink, collage, and realistic paintings.  He would write some forty books throughout his life.  They are typified by Anti-Struwwwelpeter ("Anti-Strawpeter," a parody of Heinrich Hoffman's popular German children's book, Struwwelpeter), Die Schoepfung (Waechter's re-telling of Biblical creation), and Der Kronenklauer ("The Crown Snatchers," an anti-authoritarian fable).

In 1979 he co-founded Titanic, another satirical magazine.  His cartoons featured regularly until 1992, when he began focusing on teaching, writing books, and writing and directing plays.

Waechter's final work was Vollmond ("Full Moon"), a fantastic tale of a space journey.  He completed it while undergoing treatment for lung cancer.  He died on September 16, 2005, at the age of 67, leaving behind a wife and three sons.

Honors
 1975: Deutscher Jugendliteraturpreis for Wir können noch viel zusammen machen
 1983: Brüder-Grimm-Preis des Landes Berlin
 1993: Hessischer Kulturpreis
 1999: Deutscher Jugendliteraturpreis for Der rote Wolf
 2003: Alex-Wedding-Preis
 2003: Preis der Binding-Kulturstiftung

Books
 Ich bin der Größte, 1966 (Frankfurt am Main: Bärmeier & Nikel)
 Die Wahrheit über Arnold Hau, 1966 (with F. W. Bernstein and Robert Gernhardt).
 Der kleine Zweckermann, 1969 (Frankfurt am Main: Bärmeier & Nikel)
 Der Anti-Struwwelpeter, 1970
 Die Kronenklauer, 1972 (with Bernd Eilert)
 Tischlein deck dich und Knüppel aus dem Sack, 1972 (Subtitle: Ein neues Märchen)
 Brülle ich zum Fenster raus, 1973
 Wir können noch viel zusammen machen, 1973 (picture book)
 So dumm waren die Hebräer, 1973
 Das Ungeheuer-Spiel, 1975
 Opa Huckes Mitmach-Kabinett, 1976
 Schule mit Clowns, Der Teufel mit den drei goldenen Haaren, Pustekuchen (1975/76 Ellermann Verlag, Verlag der Autoren)
 Die Bauern im Brunnen, 1978
 Wahrscheinlich guckt wieder kein Schwein, 1978
 Kiebich und Dutz, 1979
 Die Reise, 1980 (Subtitle: Eine schrecklich schöne Bildergeschichte, "A Terribly Beautiful Picture History")
 Es lebe die Freihei..., 1981 
 Fühlmäuse, 1981
 Wer kommt mit auf die Lofoten?, 1982
 Das Grundgesetz für die Bundesrepublik Deutschland, 1982
 Männer auf verlorenem Posten, 1983
 Nur den Kopf nicht hängen lassen, 1983
 Glückliche Stunde, 1986
 Die Mondtücher, 1988
 Mich wundert, daß ich fröhlich bin, 1991
 Die letzten Dinge, 1992
 Da bin ich, 1997
 F. K. Waechters Erzähltheater, 1997
 Der rote Wolf, 1998
 Mein 1. Glas Bier, 1998
 Der Kleine im Glaspott, 1999
 Die Geschichte vom albernen Hans, 2000
 Der Frosch und das Mädchen, 2000
 Steinhauers Fuß, 2001
 Die Schöpfung, 2002
 Waechter, 2002
 Prinz Hamlet, 2005
 Vollmond, 2005

Plays (selection)
 Die Beinemacher (1974)
 Der Teufel mit den drei goldenen Haaren (1975)
 Die Bremer Stadtmusikanten (1977)
 Die Reise nach Aschenfeld (1984)
 Ausflug mit Clowns (1985)
 F. K. Waechters Ixypsilonzett (1990)
 Die letzten Dinge (1992)
 Die Eisprinzessin (1993, in two versions)
 Prinz Hamlet (1995)
 Lysistrata (after Aristophanes, 1997)
 Die Aschenputtler ( 1998)
 Tristan und Isolde (2002)
 Karneval der Tiere (2002)
 Der Narr des Königs (Kwast) (2003)

Criticism
 Die schärfsten Kritiker der Elche. Die Neue Frankfurter Schule in Wort und Strich und Bild, Oliver Maria Schmitt, Berlin: Alexander Fest Verlag 2001.

External links

 A short bio

1937 births
2005 deaths
Writers from Gdańsk
Naturalized citizens of Germany
People from the Free City of Danzig
Burials at Frankfurt Main Cemetery
German male dramatists and playwrights
20th-century German dramatists and playwrights
21st-century German dramatists and playwrights
German draughtsmen
German cartoonists
German children's book illustrators